Robert Gorman may refer to:

 Robert A. Gorman (born 1937), American law professor at the University of Pennsylvania Law School
 Robert J. Gorman (1915–2007), Chicago attorney
 Robert N. Gorman (1896–1962), judge in the U.S. State of Ohio
 Robert Hy Gorman (born 1980), American actor